Stéphane Mazars (born 25 March 1969) is a French lawyer and politician of La République En Marche! (LREM) who has been serving as a member of the French National Assembly since the 2017 elections, representing the department of Aveyron's 1st constituency

Political career
In parliament, Mazars serves as member of the Committee on Legal Affairs. In this capacity, he was the parliament's rapporteur on a 2021 reform of France's procedural law proposed by Minister of Justice Éric Dupond-Moretti.

In addition to his committee assignments, Mazars is part of the parliamentary friendship groups with Gabon, Kosovo and Turkey.

Political positions
In July 2019, Mazars decided not to align with his parliamentary group's majority and became one of 52 LREM members who abstained from a vote on the French ratification of the European Union’s Comprehensive Economic and Trade Agreement (CETA) with Canada.

See also
 2017 French legislative election

References

1969 births
Living people
Deputies of the 15th National Assembly of the French Fifth Republic
La République En Marche! politicians
Place of birth missing (living people)
Senators of Aveyron
Members of Parliament for Aveyron
Deputies of the 16th National Assembly of the French Fifth Republic